Frank Gallacher (7 April 1943 – 23 February 2009) was a Scottish-Australian actor.

Gallacher was born in Glasgow in 1943. In 1962, aged 19, he was working in London when his parents and younger sister decided to emigrate to Australia. Gallacher declined to join them, preferring to remain in London, but emigrated to Brisbane a year later where he worked as a schoolteacher. He spent three years in Papua New Guinea teaching English. On his return to Brisbane, he joined an amateur theatre company, which eventually gained him admission to the Queensland Theatre Company.

In 1977, Gallacher was in Melbourne, performing in David Williamson's play The Club, and he remained with the Melbourne Theatre Company from then on. In 2005, he played Lear in the MTC production of King Lear.

He was well known in the 1970s for his television roles in Shannon's Mob and The Lost Islands. His film roles included Proof (1991), Dark City (1998), Till Human Voices Wake Us (2002), Peter Pan (2003), One Perfect Day (2004) and December Boys (2007).

Filmography

References

External links

1943 births
2009 deaths
20th-century Australian male actors
20th-century Scottish male actors
21st-century Australian male actors
21st-century Scottish male actors
Australian male film actors
Australian male Shakespearean actors
Australian male stage actors
Australian male television actors
Australian people of Scottish descent
Male actors from Brisbane
Male actors from Glasgow
Scottish emigrants to Australia
Scottish male film actors
Scottish male Shakespearean actors
Scottish male stage actors
Scottish male television actors